is a railway station on the Tobu Skytree Line in Adachi, Tokyo, Japan, operated by the private railway operator Tobu Railway.

Lines

Station layout
This station consists of two opposite side platforms serving two tracks.

Platforms

History
The station opened on 1 April 1902.

References

External links

 Tobu station information 

Railway stations in Tokyo
Railway stations in Japan opened in 1902